KIWA-FM (105.3) is a commercial radio station serving the Sheldon, Iowa area.  The station primarily broadcasts a classic rock format.  They also broadcast local sports and weather.

KIWA-FM and sister station KIWA (AM) are owned by the Sheldon Broadcasting Company, Inc. Studios are located at 411 9th St. in Sheldon. The stations also share a transmitter site behind the National Guard facility, on Sheldon's west side.

External links
KIWA-FM website

IWA
Sheldon, Iowa